"Jockin' Jay-Z" is a song by American rapper Jay-Z, produced by Kanye West. Originally intended for inclusion on his eleventh studio album The Blueprint 3, the song didn't make the final track listing and remained a digital-only single until it was included as a b-side on various releases of the "Empire State of Mind" single. It samples "Dumb Girl" by Run-D.M.C. and first leaked on the internet in July 2008 – but with low quality sound. The mastered version was released in August 2008.

Background
Jay-Z debuted the song at a Kanye West show at Madison Square Garden in August 2008. West told the audience that he wanted to play a beat he'd been working on, and once it started, Jay-Z came out and rapped over it. Once the abridged version of song concluded, Jay-Z and West simultaneously struck b-boy stances. The track contains a vocal sample of "Dumb Girl" by Run-DMC. West came up with the idea of revamping Run's line, "I seen you jockin' J.C."

Oasis lyric war
The song's earliest form as previewed at Kanye West's Madison Square Garden show in August 2008 included the line "That bloke from Oasis said I couldn't play guitar, somebody should have told him I'm a fucking rock star" followed by the opening line to the Oasis song "Wonderwall". This was a response to a comment made by Oasis guitarist and songwriter Noel Gallagher in April 2008 when he suggested that a hip-hop headline act was wrong for the Glastonbury Festival. This set off a media-fueled storm of controversy. At Glastonbury Jay-Z performed an ironic version of Oasis's "Wonderwall". Jay-Z's reactions were reportedly described by an Oasis band member as like that of an eight-year-old girl. When Oasis later split due to a personality clash between Noel and Liam Gallagher, Jay-Z scored a point back by suggesting he would like to work with Liam.

Charts

Release history

References 

2008 singles
Jay-Z songs
Song recordings produced by Kanye West
Songs written by Kanye West
Songs written by Jay-Z
Songs written by Joseph Simmons
2008 songs
Roc-A-Fella Records singles